Benighted Pass is a snow pass between Mount Watt and Mount Roy in the Barker Range of the Victory Mountains, Victoria Land. The name was suggested by New Zealand geologist M.G. Laird and derives from the forced lay-over of his field party in an emergency tent due to bad weather on the pass during 1981–82.

References
 

Mountain passes of Victoria Land
Borchgrevink Coast